Muro Dam is a concrete gravity dam located in Nara prefecture in Japan. The dam is used for flood control and water supply. The catchment area of the dam is 169 km2. The dam impounds about 105  ha of land when full and can store 16900 thousand cubic meters of water. The construction of the dam was started in 1966 and completed in 1973.

References

Dams in Nara Prefecture
1973 establishments in Japan